Guillardia is a genus of flagellate cryptomonad algae belonging to the family Geminigeraceae, containing a secondary plastid  within a reduced cytoplasmic compartment that contains a vestigial nucleomorph. There is only one characterised member of this genus, Guillardia theta.

Genomes 
Guillardia theta was  the first cryptophyte to have its nuclear genome sequenced. The genome contains 87 Mbp, encoding around 24,840 genes. The complete nucleomorph and plastid  genomes have been sequenced, containing 551 kbp and 121 kbp respectively.

Optogenetic tools
Two anion-conducting channelrhodopsins were isolated from Guillardia theta that hyperpolarize neuronal membrane potential and are potent inhibitors of neural activity.

References 

Cryptomonad genera